Aicardi is a surname. Notable people with the surname include:

Giovanni Battista Visconti Aicardi (1644-1713), Roman Catholic Bishop of Novara 
Cristina Aicardi (born 1986), Peruvian badminton player
Giorgio Matteo Aicardi (1891–1984), Italian painter and illustrator
Jean Aicardi (born 1926), French neurologist
Jérémy Aicardi (born 1988), French rugby sevens player 
Matteo Aicardi (born 1986), Italian water polo player
Beatriz H. C. Aicardi de Neuhaus, Argentine human rights activist, co-founder of the Grandmothers Association of Plaza de Mayo